Athous propinquus is a species of click beetle from the family Elateridae which is found in Bulgaria and the European part of Turkey.

References

Beetles described in 1889
Beetles of Europe